In the Right Place is the sixth album by the New Orleans R&B artist Dr. John. The album was released on Atco Records in 1973, and became the biggest selling album of Dr. John's career.

The song "Such a Night" was also performed as part of The Band's The Last Waltz concert, made famous by Martin Scorsese's film.

The song "Right Place, Wrong Time" became the biggest hit from the LP, reaching the Top 10 in both the U.S. and Canada. The album itself was Dr. John's highest charting album on the Billboard 200, spending 33 weeks on the chart and peaking at #24 on June 23, 1973.

Track listing

Personnel
Musicians
 Mac Rebennack – vocals, piano on "Qualified", organ on "Peace Brother Peace" and percussion on "I Been Hoodood"
 Allen Toussaint – piano, electronic piano, acoustic guitar, conga drums, tambourine, background vocals, vocal arrangements, arrangement and conducting
 Gary Brown – electric and acoustic saxophones
The Meters
 Leo Nocentelli – lead guitar
 Art Neville – organ
 George Porter Jr. – bass guitar
 Joseph Modeliste – drums

Additional musicians
 Ralph MacDonald – percussion on "Shoo Fly Marches On", "Such a Night" and "I Been Hoodood".
 David Spinozza – guitar solo on "Right Place Wrong Time".
 The Bonaroo Horn Section – horns
 Robbie Montgomery and Jessie Smith – backing vocals

Technical
 Allen Toussaint – producer
 Karl Richardson – engineer
 Allen Toussaint, Arif Mardin and Jimmy Douglass – remix engineers
James Flournoy Holmes – album design and paintings

References 

1973 albums
Dr. John albums
Albums produced by Allen Toussaint
Albums recorded at Sea-Saint Studios
Atco Records albums
Albums with cover art by James Flournoy Holmes